Jouma (Arabic: جومة) is an area that gathers Lebanese villages in Akkar District in Akkar Governorate.

Villages

 Aaiyat
 Ain Yaaqoub
 Akkar al-Atika
 Beino - Qboula
 Beit Mellat
 Bezbina
 Borj
 Chakdouf
 Chittaha
 Dahr Laissineh
 Dawra
 Doura, Akkar
 Gebrayel
 Ilat
 Jebrayel
 Memnaa
 Rahbeh
 Tachaa
 Tikrit

References

Akkar divisions